Capitan and Kapitan are equivalents of the English Captain in other European languages.

Capitan, Capitano, and Kapitan may also refer to:

Places in the United States
Capitan, Louisiana, an unincorporated community
Capitan, New Mexico, a village
Capitan Mountains, New Mexico

People
George Kapitan, who wrote for Timely in the Golden Age of Comic Books.
Tomis Kapitan, an American philosopher and Distinguished Teaching Professor Emeritus at Northern Illinois University.

Arts and entertainment
Der Kapitän or The Captain (film), a 1971 German comedy
Der Kapitän (TV series), a German series
Le Capitan, a novel by Michel Zevaco

Other uses
Kapitän, a shortened version of several ranks in the German navy
Kapitan, another name for Opperhoofd, a Dutch colonial governor
Opel Kapitän, a luxury car manufactured from 1938 to 1970
Capitan (tequila), a brand of tequila produced by Barton Brands
Capitan Records, a record label set up by US musician Chris Brokaw
Capitán, a dog of Villa Carlos Paz who has spent six years in vigil at the grave of his master

See also 
Barangay captain, usually referred in the Philippines as "kapitan"
Capoten, a drug used for the treatment of hypertension
El Capitan (disambiguation)
Kapitan Arab, a Dutch East Indies title for the representative of Arab enclave
Kapitan Cina or Capitan China, an originally Portuguese title for the representative of a Chinese enclave
Kapitan Keling, a representative of an Indian community
Kapudan Pasha, the admiral of the navy of the Ottoman Empire
Katepano, a senior Byzantine military rank and office